Neven Pajkić (born 25 August 1977) is a Bosnian-born Canadian former professional boxer. His professional debut was on 18 November 2005 against Sheldon Hinton. On 4 February 2011, he won the vacant NABA Canada heavyweight title in a match against Johnnie White. His first and only professional defeat was against Tyson Fury on 12 November 2011, after the referee stopped the fight in the third round.

Personal life
Pajkić was born in Sarajevo to a Bosnian Serb family. When the Bosnian War started, the family moved to Belgrade, and later to Canada.

He began amateur matches in 2003. After 17 wins in a row, he had his professional debut in 2005. Due to training for the professional debut, he was unable to compete in the 2004 Summer Olympics. His idol since he was a child is Mike Tyson.

He is married.

Acting career
He has appeared in Against the Ropes, A History of Violence, Phantom Punch and ZOS: Zone of Separation.

Professional boxing record

|-
|align="center" colspan=8|17 Wins (5 knockouts, 12 decisions), 1 Loss (1 knockout, 0 decisions) 
|-
| align="center" style="border-style: none none solid solid; background: #e3e3e3"|Result
| align="center" style="border-style: none none solid solid; background: #e3e3e3"|Record
| align="center" style="border-style: none none solid solid; background: #e3e3e3"|Opponent
| align="center" style="border-style: none none solid solid; background: #e3e3e3"|Type
| align="center" style="border-style: none none solid solid; background: #e3e3e3"|Round
| align="center" style="border-style: none none solid solid; background: #e3e3e3"|Date
| align="center" style="border-style: none none solid solid; background: #e3e3e3"|Location
| align="center" style="border-style: none none solid solid; background: #e3e3e3"|Notes
|-align=center
|Win
|
|align=left| Shane Andreesen
|UD
|10
|14 Dec 2012
|align=left| Windsor, Ontario, Canada
|align=left|
|-align=center
|Loss
|
|align=left| Tyson Fury
|TKO
|3
|12 Nov 2011
|align=left| Manchester, England
|align=left|
|-
|Win
|
|align=left| Johnnie White
|UD
|10
|4 Feb 2011
|align=left| Barrie, Ontario, Canada
|align=left|
|-
|Win
|
|align=left| Andreas Sidon
|UD
|8
|30 Oct 2010
|align=left| Rama, Ontario, Canada
|align=left|
|-
|Win
|
|align=left| Raphael Butler
|UD
|10
|4 Sep 2010
|align=left| Toronto, Ontario, Canada
|align=left|
|-
|Win
|
|align=left| Grzegorz Kielsa
|UD
|10
|30 Jun 2010
|align=left| Rama, Ontario, Canada
|align=left|
|-
|Win
|
|align=left| Grzegorz Kielsa
|UD
|10
|27 Mar 2010
|align=left| Rama, Ontario, Canada
|align=left|
|-
|Win
|
|align=left| Jason Gavern
|UD
|6
|16 Jan 2010
|align=left| Mississauga, Ontario, Canada
|align=left|
|-
|Win
|
|align=left| Edward Dawson
|TKO
|2
|15 Oct 2009
|align=left| Winnipeg, Manitoba, Canada
|align=left|
|-
|Win
|
|align=left| Nicolai Firtha
|UD
|8
|2 Apr 2009
|align=left| Toronto, Ontario, Canada
|align=left|
|-
|Win
|
|align=left| Shane Andreesen
|UD
|8
|27 Sep 2008
|align=left| Brampton, Ontario, Canada
|align=left|
|-
|Win
|
|align=left| Ryan Thompson
|UD
|6
|31 May 2008
|align=left| Brantford, Ontario, Canada
|align=left|
|-
|Win
|
|align=left| Sam Comming
|
|4
|10 Nov 2007
|align=left| Brantford, Ontario, Canada
|align=left|
|-
|Win
|
|align=left| Darrell Flint
|TKO
|1
|16 Mar 2007
|align=left| Winnipeg, Manitoba, Canada
|align=left|
|-
|Win
|
|align=left| Jason Weiss
|TKO
|3
|18 Nov 2006
|align=left| Brampton, Ontario, Canada
|align=left|
|-
|Win
|
|align=left| Stephane Tessier
|
|4
|12 May 2006
|align=left| Shawinigan, Quebec, Canada
|align=left|
|-
|Win
|
|align=left| Walter Kienbaum
|
|2
|9 Mar 2006
|align=left| Mississauga, Ontario, Canada
|align=left|
|-
|Win
|
|align=left| Sheldon Hinton
|
|3
|18 Nov 2005
|align=left| Edmonton, Alberta, Canada
|align=left|
|}

References

External links
 Neven Pajkic at boxrec.com
 Tyson Fury dropped hard, but survives to stop Pajkić

1977 births
Living people
Sportspeople from Sarajevo
Serbs of Bosnia and Herzegovina
Canadian male boxers
Canadian people of Serbian descent
Yugoslav emigrants to Canada
Yugoslav Wars refugees
Refugees in Serbia
Eastern Orthodox Christians from Canada
Heavyweight boxers